The Bangkok Dock Company (1957) Limited is a Thai shipbuilding company. It operates as a  state enterprise under the oversight of the Ministry of Defence. It was founded in 1865 as the Bangkok Dock Co by Captain John Bush, the harbour master of Bangkok, and was acquired by the Royal Thai Navy in 1957. The company now has two facilities: the original Bangkok dockyard on Charoen Krung Road next to Wat Yan Nawa, and a newer main facility operating at the Mahidol Adulyadej Naval Dockyard at Sattahip in Chonburi Province.

References

Government-owned companies of Thailand
Shipbuilding companies of Thailand
Defence companies of Thailand
Manufacturing companies based in Bangkok
Manufacturing companies established in 1865
1865 establishments in Siam
Buildings and structures on the Chao Phraya River